Encounters Film Festival is a short film, animation and VR festival in Bristol, England. Based in Bristol, Encounters runs a six-day festival in September and its main venues are Watershed and Arnolfini, on Bristol’s harbourside.

History
The festival began in 1995 as Brief Encounters, a one-off event. Animated Encounters was set up in 2001 to celebrate and showcase animation.  In 2006 the two festivals united as the Encounters Short Film Festival.

Since 2010 Encounters Festival has been a qualifying festival for the Academy Award for Best Live Action Short Film and Best Animated Short, alongside the equivalent BAFTAs categories.  In 2011 Encounters Festival announced a new partnership with the European Film Academy Short Film Initiative, becoming a member of the 15 European festivals that present the nominations for the European Film Awards.

References

External links
 Encounters.film

Film festivals in England
Short film festivals in the United Kingdom